R. John M. Hughes, born , is a computer scientist and professor in the department of Computing Science at the Chalmers University of Technology.

Contributions
In 1984, Hughes received his PhD from the University of Oxford for the thesis "The Design and Implementation of Programming Languages".

Hughes is a member of the Functional Programming group at Chalmers, and much of his research relates to the Haskell programming language. He does research in the field of programming languages and is the author of many influential research papers on the subject, including "Why Functional Programming Matters".

Hughes is one of the developers of QuickCheck, as well as cofounder and CEO of QuviQ, which provides the QuickCheck software and offers classes in how to use it.

In 2016 he appeared in the popular science YouTube channel Computerphile explaining Functional Programming and QuickCheck.

Recognition
Hughes was elected as an ACM Fellow in 2018 for "contributions to software testing and functional programming".

See also
Haskell programming language
QuickCheck

References

Bibliography

J. Hughes. "Generalizing monads to arrows". Science of Computer Programming, (37):67-111, 2000.

External links
 John Hughes home page

Living people
Swedish computer scientists
Programming language researchers
Year of birth uncertain
Computer science educators
1958 births
Fellows of the Association for Computing Machinery